Yarpur is a village in Tanda tehsil, Ambedkar Nagar district, Uttar Pradesh, India.  The population was 67 at the 2011 Indian census.

References

Villages in Ambedkar Nagar district